2349 Kurchenko, provisional designation , is a background asteroid from the central regions of the asteroid belt, approximately  in diameter. It was discovered on 30 July 1970, by Russian astronomer Tamara Smirnova at the Crimean Astrophysical Observatory in Nauchnij, on the Crimean peninsula. It was named for Soviet flight attendant Nadezhda Kurchenko who was killed during an airline hijacking in 1970. The asteroid has a rotation period of 8.6 hours and possibly a spherical shape.

Orbit and classification 

Kurchenko is a non-family asteroid from the main belt's background population. It orbits the Sun in the central asteroid belt at a distance of 2.4–3.1 AU once every 4 years and 7 months (1,683 days; semi-major axis of 2.77 AU). Its orbit has an eccentricity of 0.12 and an inclination of 17° with respect to the ecliptic.

 Occultation
On 19 October 2008, the asteroid occulted the star . All five observers reported a negative result.

Physical characteristics 

In the SMASS classification, Kurchenko is an Xc-subtype that transitions between the X-type and the  carbonaceous C-type asteroids. It is also an assumed C-type.

Rotation period 

In April 2010, a rotational lightcurve of Kurchenko was obtained from photometric observations the R-band by astronomers at the Palomar Transient Factory in California. Lightcurve analysis gave a rotation period of 8.622 hours with a low brightness amplitude of 0.06 magnitude, indicative for a spherical shape.

Diameter and albedo 

According to the surveys carried out by the Japanese Akari satellite and the NEOWISE mission of NASA's Wide-field Infrared Survey Explorer, Kurchenko measures between 18.801 and 24.69 kilometers in diameter and its surface has an albedo between 0.071 and 0.206.

The Collaborative Asteroid Lightcurve Link assumes a standard albedo for a carbonaceous asteroid of 0.057 and calculates a diameter of 27.34 kilometers based on an absolute magnitude of 11.54.

Naming 

The official naming citation was published by the Minor Planet Center on 8 February 1982.

References

External links 
 Asteroid Lightcurve Database (LCDB), query form (info )
 Dictionary of Minor Planet Names, Google books
 Discovery Circumstances: Numbered Minor Planets (1)-(5000) – Minor Planet Center
 
 

002349
Discoveries by Tamara Mikhaylovna Smirnova
Named minor planets
002349
19700730